Rally is a candy bar manufactured by The Hershey Company. Although no exact release date is known, the bar was introduced sometime in the 1970s. It has been discontinued and brought back to store shelves on numerous occasions.

The bar is chocolate-covered with a nougat center, a coating of caramel, and rolled in peanuts.

History 
The Rally bar was introduced sometime in the 1970s by The Hershey Company. In subsequent years, it has been discontinued and also brought back to store shelves on numerous occasions.

Nutrition information

References

External links 
 Rally Bar product information on Candy Blog's site

 

The Hershey Company brands
Products introduced in 1970
Chocolate bars